The 2008 LifeLock 400 was the fifteenth points race in the 2008 NASCAR Sprint Cup schedule. Held on Sunday, June 15 at Michigan International Speedway in Brooklyn, Michigan, it was the first of two races sponsored by the internet protection service LifeLock, the other being the LifeLock.com 400 at Chicagoland Speedway on July 12.

Eleven cars set times before rain set in and cancelled qualifying, so the field was set by the rule book with points leader Kyle Busch on pole, Jeff Burton second  and Dale Earnhardt Jr. third. Jason Leffler (#70) and Tony Raines (#34) did not start because qualifying was cancelled due to rain. Kenny Wallace and the #87 car, and the #08 car, without a driver, were both withdrawn earlier in the week.

Race Recap 
In a mixture of luck, fuel economy and strategy, Dale Earnhardt Jr. scored his first win in 76 points races thanks to a late caution due to Sam Hornish Jr.'s late-race crash, and a green-white-checker finish with Patrick Carpentier and Michael Waltrip crashing near the start/finish line to end the race. Instead of completing a victory lap, or doing the traditional burnout, Earnhardt coasted on to pit road after he had run out of fuel.

Results

References

LifeLock 400
LifeLock 400
NASCAR races at Michigan International Speedway